Applegate is an unincorporated community in Placer County, California. Its ZIP code is 95703 and its area code 530.

Applegate was originally settled in 1849 by Lisbon Applegate, who came to California with his son, George, from Missouri. Part of a family that first emigrated to America in the 17th century, the Applegates bought acreage above Clipper Gap, California, and established a fruit ranch there. The main house of the Applegate Ranch was where Oliver's gas station and bar sits today. Lisbon eventually returned to Missouri but his son, George W. Applegate, stayed.

As the town grew, it was called Bear River House for its proximity to the Bear River, a short distance northwest. When a post office was established in 1855, the community officially became known as Lisbon in honor of its founder. George W. Applegate became postmaster, and in the 1870s, the settlement was renamed Applegate, also to honor its founder.

At one time, Applegate was a station on the Central Pacific Railroad (later Southern Pacific). When a second track was added in 1929, the station on the eastbound track was named East Applegate.

From Placer GOLD, November 1973;
"Applegate is a quiet little town about eight miles northeast of Auburn, rudely severed in two parts by Interstate 80. The town consists of a post office, motel, hardware store, grocery and saloon-and something else..."

Applegate is also the only known place in Northern California where the Ladyfoot Trumpet flower grows wild. Some people believe that its seeds were left here long ago when the Lemurians passed through on their way to Mount Shasta.

Climate
Alta has a Mediterranean climate that is characterized by cool, wet winters and hot, dry summers (Köppen climate classification Csa).

References

Unincorporated communities in California
Unincorporated communities in Placer County, California
Unincorporated communities in the Sacramento metropolitan area
Populated places established in 1849
1849 establishments in California